Martha Ertman (born c. 1964) is an American US law professor. She is the Carole & Hanan Sibel Research Professor of Law at the University of Maryland's Francis King Carey School of Law. She is an expert in family law and writes about contracts within relationships using her own family of three parents and a child as an example.

Life
Ertman was raised in Virginia. She and her siblings were raised in Wellesley where her mother edited "Wellesley Magazine", taught and her father, Gardner Ertman, who was an architect designed their house, and the local library.

Ertman gained degrees at Wellesley and at Northwestern University. She worked in Louisiana as a legal clerk for a District Court judge and a lawyer in Seattle. She entered academica as a visiting law faculty member at the University of Michigan, the University of Connecticut and University of Oregon. She also laught law at the University of Utah and the University of Denver.

In 2007 she moved to join the University of Maryland's Francis King Carey School of Law.

She married in 2009 to Karen Lash who she had met in 2006. She had a son named Oscar. Her wife was a legal consultant who had been an associate dean in a law school. Her 2015 book, Love's Promises: How Formal and Informal Contracts Shape All Kinds of Families includes a description of this relationship between her son, his father and her wife. She defines the three of them living as joint parents as a "Plan B" family joined together by affection and contracts. The book was named the Love’s Family Equality Council’s 2015 Book Club Pick and attracted attention in the press. The book was covered by the Washingtonian and Time magazine.

She is the Carole & Hanan Sibel Research Professor of Law at the University of Maryland's Francis King Carey School of Law.

Works include
Rethinking Commodification: Cases and Readings in Law and Culture, 2005
Love's Promises: How Formal and Informal Contracts Shape All Kinds of Families, 2015
Developing Professional Skills: Secured Transactions, 2018
Contract Law: An Integrated Approach (co-author), 2020

References 

1960s births
Living people
American legal scholars
Northwestern University alumni
Wellesley College alumni
University of Maryland, College Park faculty